Eschweilera is a genus of woody plants in the family Lecythidaceae first described as a genus in 1828. It is native to southern Mexico, Central America, South America, and Trinidad.

Species

References

 
Ericales genera
Taxonomy articles created by Polbot